Kahnanikash (also Romanized as Kahnānīkash; also known as Kahan Kāsh, Kahnān Kash, and Kapānāl Kash) is a village in Bahu Kalat Rural District, Dashtiari District, Chabahar County, Sistan and Baluchestan Province, Iran. At the 2006 census, its population was 339, in 67 families.

References 

Populated places in Chabahar County